Adam Schiff is a fictional character on the TV drama series Law & Order. He was played by Steven Hill from 1990 to 2000. Schiff was one of the original main characters of the series and appeared in every episode of the first 10 seasons except for "Everybody's Favorite Bagman", which was produced before Hill joined the cast, and the season-seven episode "D-Girl". He appeared in 229 episodes (228 episodes of Law & Order and the Law & Order: Special Victims Unit episode "Entitled"), and was the last of the original six characters to leave the show's main cast.

Character overview 
Schiff is District Attorney of New York County, and a graduate of Columbia University, where he served on the Law Review. He began his career as an ADA in 1973. He is a pragmatic Democrat of faintly liberal stripe, but regardless of political inclinations, he is never perturbed by his critics nor by uncooperative judges. Political persuasions sometimes cloud his decisions with regard to certain cases such as the death penalty; however, he has moral objections to capital punishment, having written a brief protesting it in 1971, but is not averse to seeking it against a defendant if voters want such a sentence carried out. He is also pro-choice.

While he is always pragmatic, resolute and austere in his professional conduct, he has amicable relationships with his assistants. He is closest to Benjamin Stone (Michael Moriarty), and is saddened to see him resign when a witness he is trying to protect is murdered. His relationship with Stone's successor, Jack McCoy (Sam Waterston), is more problematic, as McCoy is more ruthless and unconventional, and his habitual bending of trial rules occasionally garners Schiff bad publicity. However, the two eventually grow closer and respect each other.

Schiff has many friends among New York's elite, including powerful politicians, judges, and businessmen. Over the show's run, however, many of these friends prove themselves to be either corrupt or hiding secrets. The politician who first asked that he run for district attorney, Edward Vogel (George Martin), later tries to use their relationship to quash the prosecution of his son's murderer to avoid having his son's homosexuality revealed. In another case, one of his closest friends, Judge Edgar Hynes (Louis Zorich), commits suicide after being caught taking bribes. Another, Carl Anderton (Robert Vaughn), a high-powered CEO, is discovered to be suffering from bipolar disorder and attempts to arrange an unjust punishment for his similarly affected grandson Terence (Sam Huntington), who had killed his half-sister during a manic phase, to hide his own condition. The once solid friendship destroyed, Anderton seeks vengeance and backs Schiff's opponent Gary Feldman (Cliff Gorman) in a primary election;  Schiff nevertheless is reelected.

In a 1997 episode, Schiff's wife is left in a coma after suffering a severe stroke.  She dies, after he elects to have her taken off life support. Their son Josh is mentioned in several episodes, as are Josh's own wife and son, but he never appears on screen.

Schiff is a fan of the Boston Red Sox and Columbia Lions football.

After Law & Order
In 2000, the character of Schiff was written out of the show to accommodate the 78-year-old Hill's retirement from acting. Within the story arc of the show, Schiff leaves the DA's office to accept a role in coordinating commemorations of the Holocaust Project. He goes on to work with Simon Wiesenthal. He is succeeded by interim district attorney Nora Lewin (Dianne Wiest).

After McCoy becomes the district attorney in 2007, he commented that he now understands why Schiff always seemed to be in a bad mood.

In 2009, Schiff is said to be in Africa with former President Jimmy Carter, attempting to get into Zimbabwe. While in Africa, he sees an article about McCoy's election campaign on the Internet and lends him his support.

Real-life counterparts
Adam Schiff shares his name and political party with the subsequently elected U.S. Representative from California, who also had a prior career as a federal prosecutor. Despite the fact that Congressman Schiff once interned in the same Manhattan office where Law & Order is set, Dick Wolf has denied any correlation between the two Schiffs and instead states that the character is loosely based upon long-serving Manhattan District Attorney Robert Morgenthau. Of the resemblance, Congressman Schiff remarked that when he introduced himself to voters while running for office, "they would light up and say, 'Oh yes, I'm familiar with your work'... Of course, they had never heard of me. They were thinking of Adam Schiff from Law & Order. I started to watch to make sure he was a good character... I was happy to see he is a pretty good guy."

References

Fictional Democrats (United States)
Fictional American lawyers
Law & Order characters
Fictional American Jews
Television characters introduced in 1990
Fictional district attorneys
Crossover characters in television
Fictional characters based on real people
American male characters in television

pt:Adam Schiff